Two flights named American Airlines Flight 383 (IATA: AA 383; ICAO: AAL383; AMERICAN 383) have been involved in notable aviation accidents:

 American Airlines Flight 383 (1965), crashed on approach to the Cincinnati/Northern Kentucky International Airport, leaving only 4 survivors out of the 62 onboard
 American Airlines Flight 383 (2016), suffered an uncontained engine failure and fire during takeoff at Chicago O'Hare Airport on October 28, 2016

See also
 American Airlines accidents and incidents

383
Flight number disambiguation pages